Niklas Landgraf (born 1 March 1996) is a German professional footballer who plays as a defender for Hallescher FC.

References

External links
 

Living people
1996 births
Sportspeople from Chemnitz
German footballers
Association football defenders
Dynamo Dresden II players
Dynamo Dresden players
Hallescher FC players
3. Liga players
2. Bundesliga players
Footballers from Saxony